Mississippi Highway 605 (MS 605) is a state highway in Mississippi. It is an expressway and generally runs north from U.S. Highway 90 in Gulfport, to an intersection with East Wortham Road in Saucier, after crossing over Mississippi Highway 67 twice. MS 605 is located entirely within Harrison County.

History

MS 605 first appeared in maps in 2004, and has not changed significantly since. Prior to its designation in 2004, the portion of MS 605 between I-10 and US 90 was known as Mississippi Highway 975 (MS 975), with the remaining portion north of I-10 known as Mississippi Highway 981 (MS 981).

Major intersections

References

External links

605
Transportation in Harrison County, Mississippi